"Synchronicity" is a maxi single performed by Yui Makino first released on November 21, 2007 by Victor Entertainment under the catalog number VTCL-35007. The lyrics, composition, and arrangement for the single are provided by Yuki Kajiura, Makino Yui, Caoli Cano and Shunsuke Takizawa. It contains 3 tracks in both regular and instrumental versions. The track "Synchronicity" was featured as the opening theme to the OVA adaptation Tsubasa Tokyo Revelations. Its B-side is titled . It peaked at number 49 on the Oricon singles chart and remained on the chart for three weeks. Makino was the voice actress for Sakura in the anime TV series and films.

Sales
Oricon peak position: No. 49
Weeks on chart: 3
4,158 copies sold

Track listing
 Synchronicity
 アムリタ -弾き語り-
 Synchronicity (Instrumental)

Covers and renditions 
For Kajiura's FictionJunction album Everlasting Songs, the song was performed by Keiko and arranged by Koichi Korenaga.

References

2007 singles
2007 songs
Victor Entertainment singles
Anime songs
Tsubasa: Reservoir Chronicle